Beatrix of Sicily or Beatrice di Sicilia (Palermo, 1260 – Marquisate of Saluzzo, 1307) was a Sicilian princess. In 1296 she became Marchioness consort of Saluzzo.

Beatrix was the daughter of Manfred of Sicily and his wife Helena Angelina Doukaina. After the battle of Benevento, 26 February 1266, and the death of her father, Beatrix was imprisoned in Naples together with her family. After 1271, she was transferred to Naples. Beatrix regained her freedom only in 1284, after the Battle of the Gulf of Naples, thanks to Roger of Lauria.

In 1286 Beatrix married Manfred IV, son of Thomas I, Marquess of Saluzzo. In 1296, after his father-in-law's death, she became Marchioness consort of Saluzzo.

Beatrix died in 1307.

Issue
Manfred and Beatrix had two children:

Frederick I of Saluzzo.
Catherine of Saluzzo. Married William Enganna, Lord of the Barge.

References

Sources

141

Hohenstaufen
Sicilian princesses
Marchionesses of Saluzzo
Nobility from Palermo
13th-century Italian women
14th-century Italian women
1260 births
1307 deaths
Daughters of kings